Opistholebes is a genus of trematodes in the family Opecoelidae.

Species
Opistholebes adcotylophorus Manter, 1947
Opistholebes amplicoelus Nicoll, 1915
Opistholebes cotylophorus Ozaki, 1935
Opistholebes diodontis Cable, 1956
Opistholebes dongshanensis Liu, 1999
Opistholebes elongatus Ozaki, 1937
Opistholebes equicotylus Bilqees & Nighat, 1982
Opistholebes indicus Gupta, 1968
Opistholebes microovus Ku & Shen, 1965
Opistholebes tetradontis Gupta, 1968

References

Opecoelidae
Plagiorchiida genera